Melia is a feminine given name of Greek origin and comes from μελία, the ancient Greek word for ash-tree. In Greek mythology, Melia was an Oceanid, daughter of the Titans Oceanus and Tethys.

People
 Melia Kreiling, actress
 Melia Watras, American violist

Fictional characters
 Melia (Stargate), member of the Atlantean High Council in the Stargate fictional universe
 Melia Antiqua, in Xenoblade Chronicles
 Melia, daughter of Oebalus in the Mozart opera Apollo et Hyacinthus

See also
 Melia (mythology)

References

Feminine given names